Robert Earl Hughes  (June 4, 1926 – July 10, 1958) was an American man who was, during his lifetime, the heaviest human being recorded, weighing . He remains the heaviest human in the world able to walk without the need of assistance.

Early life and family
Robert Hughes was born in Monticello, Missouri, the son of Abraham Guy Hughes (1878–1957) and Georgia Alice Weatharby (1906–1947). He was born "weighing a hefty but not abnormal"  and was a "fairly average-size baby until he contracted whooping cough at about five months old." The whooping cough was believed to have played a role in his extraordinary weight gain.

The family moved to Fishhook, Illinois, when Robert was six months old. He had two younger brothers, Guy B. Hughes (1927–2006) and Donald Hughes (1929–2012).

Condition
During his lifetime, he was the heaviest human on earth. Unlike most people of great weight, he was not bed-bound, and he holds to this day the record of the heaviest human to walk. Hughes's extreme weight was attributed to a ruptured thyroid gland.

Career
Hughes made some income from selling photographs of himself. During his adult life, Hughes made guest appearances at carnivals and fairs. At age 27, he joined a travelling roadshow, often accompanied by some of his family. Plans to appear on The Ed Sullivan Show variety television program were announced but never materialised.

In 1957, travelling with his brother Guy and Guy's wife Lillian, Robert had bookings throughout the country. Walking, even with his massive cane, had started to be difficult for the 31-year-old. Word reached him at a carnival that his father had died at age 79. Guy and Lillian returned to Illinois for the funeral, but Robert stayed on, believing it was his duty to honour his commitments. At season's end, he returned to Guy's farm, unable to walk more than  without the assistance of family members, who would follow closely, lugging a 5-foot- (1.5 meter-) wide, steel-reinforced chair in case of exhaustion.

Death
While travelling with the roadshow in Nappanee, Indiana, Hughes developed a rash, and the flesh under his fingernails turned blue.  Because he was unable to be moved to the nearest hospital in Bremen, Indiana, doctors treated him at his trailer, and determined he was suffering from measles. He developed uremia.

He died on July 10, 1958 at the age of 32.  He was buried in a small church cemetery in Benville, Illinois, in Brown County near his hometown, Fishhook. About 2,000 people attended the funeral.

He is erroneously said to have been buried in a piano case. This error stemmed from a sentence that appeared in the Guinness Book of World Records: "He was buried in a coffin the size of a piano case." His headstone notes that he was the world's heaviest man at a confirmed .

See also
 List of the heaviest people

References

Further reading

1926 births
1958 deaths
American entertainers
Burials in Illinois
People from Pike County, Illinois
Sideshow performers
Obesity in the United States
Deaths from kidney disease